Sarvan is a Spanish comics series featuring an eponymous character, written by Antonio Segura and drawn by Jordi Bernet. The series was launched in the comics magazine Cimoc in 1982, had a relatively short serial run before the artist and writer moved on to their next collaboration, Kraken.

Synopsis
Sarvan is a woman living in a fantasy-science fiction environment, on a barbarous planet where a blonde astronaut, Heloin, arrives. The volatile Sarvan claims him for herself, and this generates an almost endless series of struggles. In many of these clashes Sarvan dresses in a revealing bikini that frequently slides down.

References

Spanish comics
Spanish comics characters
Comics characters introduced in 1982
Science fiction comics
Spanish comics titles
Science fiction characters
Fantasy comics
1982 comics debuts